Lyles is a surname. Notable people with the surname include:

Athletes
 Jordan Lyles (born 1990), American baseball player
 Josephus Lyles (born 1998), American track and field athlete
 Kevin Lyles (born 1973), American track and field athlete
 Lenny Lyles (1936–2011), American football player
 Lester Lyles (American football) (born 1962), American football player
 Nate Lyles (born 1985), American football player
 Noah Lyles (born 1997), American track and field athlete
 Robert Lyles (born 1961), American football player
 Trey Lyles (born 1995), Canadian–American basketball player

Other
 A. C. Lyles (1918–2013), American film producer
 Aubrey Lyles (1883–1932), American songwriter, lyricist, and vaudeville performer
 Kathryn Lyles, American stage actor
 Lester Lyles (born 1946), United States Air Force general

See also
 Lyle's flying fox, a species of flying fox
 Lyle's Golden Syrup, a form of inverted sugar syrup
 Lyles, Tennessee, an unincorporated town near Nashville, Tennessee, United States
 Lyles Station, Indiana, an unincorporated town in Gibson County, Indiana, United States